The year 1594 in science and technology involved some significant events.

Botany
 Tulip bulbs planted by Carolus Clusius in the Hortus Botanicus Leiden, Holland, first flower.

Exploration
 First voyage  of Willem Barents in the  Arctic Ocean in search of the North-east passage.
 John Davis publishes a treatise on navigation, The Seamans Secrets, and invents a version of the backstaff.
 Robert Hues publishes a practical treatise on the use of terrestrial and celestial globes in navigation, Tractatus de globis et eorum usu.

Medicine
 Anatomical theatre completed at the University of Padua.

Technology
 Bevis Bulmer sets up a system at Blackfriars, London, for pumping a public water supply.

Publications
 Johannes Huser of Waldkirch completes the publication of Paracelsus's works.
 Baldo Angelo Abati : Opus discussarum concertationum praeclarum, de rebus, verbis, et sententiis controversis, ex omnibus fere scriptoribus, libri XV published at Pesaro.

Births

Deaths
  June 7 – Rodrigo Lopez (b. c. 1517), physician to Elizabeth I of England.
 Cristóbal Acosta (b. c. 1525), physician.

References

 
16th century in science
1590s in science